Ferroxidase also known as Fe(II):oxygen oxidoreductase is an enzyme that catalyzes the oxidization of iron II to iron III:
 4 Fe2+ + 4 H+ + O2 ⇔ 4 Fe3+ + 2H2O

Examples 

Human genes encoding proteins with ferroxidase activity include:
 CP – Ceruloplasmin
 FTH1 – Ferritin heavy chain
 FTMT – Ferritin, mitochondrial
 HEPH - Hephaestin

References 

 
 
 

EC 1.16.3